Karimuttathu Jagadeesapanicker Rakesh (born on 12 May 1983) is an Indian cricketer who plays for the Kerala cricket team in domestic cricket.

References

Indian cricketers
Kerala cricketers
1983 births
Living people
People from Thiruvalla